Elaine Lake is a lake in the Canadian province of Saskatchewan. It is located north of Prince Albert National Park in the Thunder Hills of the Northern Saskatchewan Administration District.

Elaine Lake is in the Churchill River drainage basin. The lake's outflow is at the southern end and it heads west a short distance into Pease Lake. Pease Lake connects to Buhl Lake, the source of Buhl Creek. Buhl Creek is a tributary of the Smoothstone River, which is a tributary of the Churchill River.

Along the northern shore is Elaine Lake Outfitting.

Elaine Lake Recreation Site 
Elaine Lake Recreation Site is a small wilderness campground on the southern shore with no services and a game preserve called Elaine Lake Road Corridor Game Preserve adjacent to it.

See also 
List of lakes of Saskatchewan
Tourism in Saskatchewan

References 

Lakes of Saskatchewan